Folashade Abigeal Abugan (born 17 December 1990) is a female Nigerian sprinter who specializes in the 400 metres. She was the 400 m bronze medalist at the 2007 All-Africa Games and improved to the silver medal at the 2008 African Championships, where she set a personal best time of 50.89 seconds. She won gold medals at the 2008 World Junior Championships in Athletics and the 2009 African Junior Athletics Championships.

She appeared at the 2010 Commonwealth Games in Delhi and won two silver medals for Nigeria in the 400 m and in 4x400 m relay. However, Abugan was disqualified and banned after failing a drugs test and testing positive for testosterone prohormone in her 'A' sample. She waived the right to have her B sample analysed.

Achievements

References

External links
 
 
 
 
 
 
 
 

1990 births
Living people
Doping cases in athletics
Yoruba sportswomen
Nigerian female sprinters
Nigerian sportspeople in doping cases
Olympic athletes of Nigeria
Athletes (track and field) at the 2008 Summer Olympics
Athletes (track and field) at the 2006 Commonwealth Games
Athletes (track and field) at the 2010 Commonwealth Games
Athletes (track and field) at the 2014 Commonwealth Games
Athletes (track and field) at the 2018 Commonwealth Games
Commonwealth Games silver medallists for Nigeria
Commonwealth Games medallists in athletics
African Games gold medalists for Nigeria
African Games medalists in athletics (track and field)
African Games bronze medalists for Nigeria
Athletes (track and field) at the 2007 All-Africa Games
Yoruba people
Olympic female sprinters
20th-century Nigerian women
21st-century Nigerian women
Medallists at the 2006 Commonwealth Games
Medallists at the 2014 Commonwealth Games